Mosadi is a 2019 Tamil language heist-thriller film directed by Jagadeesan. The film stars Viju Ayyapasamy and Pallavi Dora in the lead roles.

Cast  
Credited cast:
Viju Ayyapasamy 
Pallavi Dora as Kuruvanji 
Vijayan as a minister

Production 
The film is directed by Jagadeesan, an assistant of K. Bhagyaraj. Tollywood actress Pallavi Dora was signed to make her Tamil debut. The title poster includes a handcuffed image to indicate that the film is a crime thriller. The film is about the conversion of black money following 2016 Indian banknote demonetisation.

Release 
The film was scehduled to release on 14 June. Thinkal Menon of The Times of India wrote that, "The movie has a not-so-bad plot, which reminds us of the interestingly-written heist film Sathuranga Vettai, which had solid performances and intriguing scenes. But Mosadi is nowhere close to it – it would have been a decent watch if the making and performance were at least average". Anupama Subramanian of the Deccan Chronicle stated that, " The director has given us an interesting plot, however, it is in the execution that he errs".

References 

2019 films
Indian heist films
2019 black comedy films
Indian black comedy films
2010s Tamil-language films
Indian thriller films
2010s heist films
2019 thriller films